John Charvet is a British political theorist, and Emeritus Professor at the London School of Economics. His interests are in political theory, contractarianism and international relations.

Books
The Social Problem in the Philosophy of Jean-Jacques Rousseau (1974)
A Critique of Freedom and Equality (1981)
Feminism (1982)
The Idea of an Ethical Community (1995)
The Liberal Project and Human Rights: The Theory and Practice of a New World Order (2008)
The Nature and Limits of Human Equality (2013)

References

Year of birth missing (living people)
Living people
Political philosophers
Academics of the London School of Economics
British political philosophers
Alumni of the University of Cambridge